Shabab Al-Iraq Sport Club, is an Iraqi football team based in Al-Karkh, Baghdad, that plays in the Iraq Division Three.

History

Changing the name
The club was founded in the name of Badr Al-Iraq, and the team played under this name in the Iraq FA Cup in the 2016–17 and 2018–19 seasons, and in the Iraq Division One league. In June 2019, the club's name was changed, and it was called Shabab Al-Iraq, and it participated in the FA Cup with this name in the subsequent seasons, such as the 2019–20 and 2020–21 seasons.

Managerial history
 Aqeel Jabbar
 Hamed Al-Kaabi
 Ahmed Fi'el
 Bassim Mahmoud

See also
 2018–19 Iraq FA Cup
 2019–20 Iraq FA Cup
 2020–21 Iraq FA Cup

References

External links
 Shabab Al-Iraq SC on Goalzz.com
 Iraq Clubs- Foundation Dates

2013 establishments in Iraq
Association football clubs established in 2013
Football clubs in Baghdad